The Governor of Ulyanovsk Oblast is the head of government of Ulyanovsk Oblast, a federal subject of Russia.

History of office 
The position of the Head of Administration was introduced in late 1991. Valentin Malafeyev, director of "Contactor" electrical equipment plant, was named the first post-Soviet leader of Ulyanovsk Oblast. He failed to gain any support from local elites, and as a result, the former communist party functionary Yury Goryachev was appointed instead. Goryachev's administration ensured a smooth transition to market economy. In December 1996 Goryachev won the first gubernatorial election in the region, distancing both from Kremlin and from communists. Four years later Goryachev was defeated by lieutenant general Vladimir Shamanov, then-commander of the 58th Army. In 2005 mayor of Dimitrovgrad Sergey Morozov became the next governor. In March 2006 the title of office was formally changed from Head of Administration to Governor of Ulyanovsk Oblast.

List of officeholders

References

Sources 

Politics of Ulyanovsk Oblast
 
Ulyanovsk